Tochigi Prefectural North Gymnasium is an arena in Ōtawara, Tochigi, Japan.

References

Basketball venues in Japan
Indoor arenas in Japan
Utsunomiya Brex
Sports venues in Tochigi Prefecture